Events from the year 1584 in India.

Events
 Francisco de Mascarenhas ends his governorship as 13th Vice Regent of Portuguese India (since 1581)
 Duarte de Menezes, 14th Viceroy of India becomes 14th Vice Regent of Portuguese India (until 1584)

Births

Deaths

See also

 Timeline of Indian history